Alpine Antics is a 1929 animated cartoon by Winkler Productions, and features Oswald the Lucky Rabbit.

Plot summary
One day at the Swiss Alps, Oswald is milking a goat which runs away upon being called by another one passing by. As Oswald's goat jumps out of the scene, the bucket used is kicked off and ends up on the rabbit's head. Oswald struggles to remove the pail but is able to get it off on time when he stumbles. Just then, his faithful St. Bernard dog comes to him, carrying a message. The message is a distress note from the girl cat seeking Oswald's help.

Oswald and the dog move forth and head upland. Obstacles on the way include large rocks and a canyon, both of which they get through with little trouble. After a few more paces, they find the girl cat up a cliff and hanging onto a branch. To reach her, they stick a ladder on top of a boulder. Oswald climbs up and collects the feline. It turns out momentarily that the boulder is in fact a wolverine which wakes up and isn't happy to see them. Frightened by this, the dog runs off, carrying the ladder with Oswald and the girl cat still on it.

Keeping away from the fierce predator, the three friends run into a cave. When they reach the entrance, they find themselves on an edge thousands of feet above water. They then move further from the exit and around the mount to hide themselves. The wolverine also enters the cave but is unaware of what lies ahead, and therefore picks up speed. As a consequence, the wolverine overshoots off the edge and plunges into the sea. Oswald and the girl cat ride the dog on their way back.

See also
 Oswald the Lucky Rabbit filmography

References

External links
 Of Rocks and Socks: The Winkler Oswalds (1928-29)
 
 Alpine Antics at the Big Cartoon Database

1929 films
1929 animated films
1920s American animated films
1920s animated short films
American black-and-white films
Films directed by Tom Palmer (animator)
Films set in the Alps
Films set in Switzerland
Oswald the Lucky Rabbit cartoons
Universal Pictures animated short films
Animated films about animals
Screen Gems short films